Leistus rufomarginatus is a species of ground beetle that is native to Europe where it can be found in the following regions: Albania, Austria, the Baltic states (except for Estonia), Benelux, Great Britain including the Isle of Man, the Czech Republic, Denmark, France, Germany, Greece, Hungary, the Republic of Ireland, Italy, Liechtenstein, Moldova, Northern Ireland, mainland Poland, Romania, Slovakia, Sweden, Switzerland, Ukraine, the states of former Yugoslavia, and European part of Turkey.

References

Nebriinae
Beetles described in 1812
Beetles of Europe